Boaz Toporovsky (born 17 July 1980) is an Israeli politician. A former chair of the National Union of Israeli Students, he served as a member of the Knesset for Yesh Atid between 2013 and 2015, and has been a member of the Knesset again since 2019. He is currently head of the Yesh Atid parliamentary group and opposition coordinator.

Biography
Toporovsky was born and grew up in Rishon LeZion, where he attended Haviv Elementary School. After completing his mandatory national service in the Israel Air Force, he studied law at Tel Aviv University, graduating with an LLB and a BA in economics, and later gaining an LLM from the same university. During his studies Toporovsky became chairman of the university's student union in 2005, holding the post until 2007. After graduating he worked as a senior advisor for Minister of Social Affairs, Isaac Herzog.

In May 2008 Toporovsky was elected chairman of the National Union of Israeli Students. In the same year, he founded the Tzabar party, heading its list for the 2009 Knesset elections, However, it received only 0.14% of the vote and failed to pass the electoral threshold. The party did win seats on Tel Aviv city council. He remained chairman of the National Union of Israeli Students until 2010. In March 2011 he became chairman of the Issta travel agency, holding the role until February 2013.

In the January 2013 Knesset elections Toporovsky was placed eighteenth on Yesh Atid's list, becoming a Knesset member when the party won 19 seats. During his first term in the Knesset he chaired the Israel–Moldova Parliamentary Friendship Group, and was a member of the Internal Affairs and Environment Committee, the Finance Committee, the House Committee, the Science and Technology Committee and the Joint Committee for the Knesset Budget.

He was placed fourteenth on the party's list for the 2015 elections, losing his seat as the party was reduced to 11 seats. Prior to the April 2019 elections Yesh Atid joined the Blue and White alliance, with Toporovsky placed thirtieth on its list. He re-entered the Knesset after the alliance won 35 seats. He was again placed thirtieth on the Blue and White list for the September 2019 elections, retaining his seat.

Toporovsky lives in Ness Ziona and is married to Shelly Herman, who participated in MasterChef Israel. The couple have three children.

References

External links

1980 births
Living people
Blue and White (political alliance) politicians
Israeli Jews
Jewish Israeli politicians
Leaders of political parties in Israel
Members of the 19th Knesset (2013–2015)
Members of the 21st Knesset (2019)
Members of the 22nd Knesset (2019–2020)
Members of the 23rd Knesset (2020–2021)
Members of the 24th Knesset (2021–2022)
Members of the 25th Knesset (2022–)
People from Rishon LeZion
Tel Aviv University alumni
Yesh Atid politicians
 Israeli businesspeople